The 1923 United States Senate special election in Minnesota took place on July 16, 1923. The election was held to fill, for the remainder of the unexpired term, the seat in the United States Senate left vacant by Republican U.S. Senator Knute Nelson, who died in office on April 28, 1923. State Senator Magnus Johnson of the Farmer–Labor Party of Minnesota defeated Governor J. A. O. Preus of the Republican Party of Minnesota, and State Senator James A. Carley of the Minnesota Democratic Party, which, together with Henrik Shipstead's victory in 1922, brought both of Minnesota's seats in the United States Senate into the hands of the Farmer–Labor Party for the first time in history.

Johnson's victory marked the first time, since Morton S. Wilkinson took office in 1859, that neither of Minnesota's seats in the United States Senate were held by a Republican. It also marked the first time, since Wilkinson's assumption of the office, that the person holding Minnesota's Class 2 U.S. Senate seat was not a Republican, and Johnson became just the second non-Republican to ever hold that seat (the first being the Democrat James Shields, whose term of office ended when Wilkinson's began).

Republican Primary

Candidates

Nominated 

 J.A.O. Preus, Governor (1921-1925), former state Insurance Commissioner (1911-1915), former state Auditor (1915-1921), Minneapolis attorney

Eliminated in Primary 

 Sydney Anderson, Lanesboro attorney, U.S. Representative from the 1st CD (1911-1925)
 Joseph A. A. Burnquist, Former state Representative from the 33rd HD (1909-1913), former Lieutenant Governor (1913-1915), former Governor (1915-1921)
 Oscar Hallam, St. Paul attorney, former Second Judicial District Judge, former Associate Justice of the Supreme Court (1913-1923)
 Ernest Lundeen, former state Representative from the 42nd HD (1911-1915), former U.S. Representative from the 5th CD (1917-1919), candidate for U.S. Senate in 1922, Minneapolis attorney
 John J. Martin, Minneapolis attorney
 Victor L. Power, Attorney and Mayor of Hibbing (1913-1922, 1923-1924)
 Thomas D. Schall, Excelsior attorney, Progressive-turned-Republican U.S. Representative from the 10th CD (1915-1925)
 Halvor Steenerson,  Former Polk County prosecuting attorney (1881-1883), former city attorney of Crookson, former state Senator from the 45th SD (1883-1887), former U.S. Representative from the 9th CD (1903-1923), resident of Crookson

Results

Farmer-Labor Primary

Candidates

Nominated 

 Magnus Johnson, State Senator from the 26th SD (1919-1923), former state Representative from the 26th House District (1915-1919)

Eliminated in Primary 

 L.A. Fritsche, Mayor of New Ulm, physician
 Charles A. Lindbergh, Former prosecuting attorney of Morrison County (1891-1893), former Republican U.S. Representative (CD 06, 1907-1917), candidate for U.S. Senate in 1916, candidate for Governor in 1918, resident of Little Falls

Results

Democratic Primary

Candidates

Nominated 

 James A. Carley, State Senator from the 3rd SD (1915-), former Democratic state Representative from the 3rd HD (1909-1911), Plainview attorney

Eliminated in Primary 

 Francis C. Cary,  Lecturer and former attorney from Minneapolis

Results

Special election

Candidates

Republican 

 J.A.O. Preus, Governor (1921-1925), former state Insurance Commissioner (1911-1915), former state Auditor (1915-1921), Minneapolis attorney

Farmer-Labor 

 Magnus Johnson, State Senator from the 26th SD (1919-1923), former state Representative from the 26th House District (1915-1919)

Democratic 

 James A. Carley, State Senator from the 3rd SD (1915-), former Democratic state Representative from the 3rd HD (1909-1911), Plainview attorney

Results

See also 
 1923 United States Senate elections

References

1923
Minnesota
United States Senate
Minnesota 1923
Minnesota 1923
United States Senate 1923